Carabus jankowskii taebeagsanensis is a subspecies of beetle in the family Carabidae. They are black coloured with brown pronotum.

References

jankowskii taebeagsanensis
Beetles described in 1983